East-West United Bank is a bank based in Luxembourg, owned by Sistema. The bank offers private banking and corporate financing. East-West United Bank was established on 12 June 1974 as a "daughter" bank of the Soviet Union's Central Bank.

History
With the support of Mr. Pierre Werner, who was the Prime Minister of the Grand Duchy of Luxembourg, on 12 June 1974, the East-West United Bank (EWUB) (Luxembourg) was formed with both the State Bank of the USSR or Gosbank and after the end of the Soviet Union, the Central Bank of Russia, and Russia's Foreign Trade Bank Vneshtorgbank (VTB) as the main shareholders from founding until 1992.

From 1992 to 2000, Imperial Bank had a major stake in EWUB of 49% and Tokobank held a 28% stake in EWUB in 1998, but, on 17 April 2000, Imperial Bank was dissolved. Imperial Bank focused on oil and natural gas supplies to East Germany and later to Germany including the oil-for-pipes program.

When VTB had a major stake in EWUB from 2000 to 2007, EWUB was one of the five foreign banks of Russia's VTB banking network.

Beginning in 2001, the Vladimir Yevtushenkov led Sistema gained a stake in EWUB. Through Sistema's subsidiary Moscow Bank for Reconstruction and Development (MDRB), which was established in 1993 with Sistema as a shareholder since 1994, Sistema controlled a 49% stake in East-West United Bank (EWUB) in February 2005 and, since 2007 Sistema has had the majority stake in EWUB.

In 2018, Sistema became 100% owner of EWUB with Sergei Pchelintsev as the CEO.

According to a declaration given on 18 October 2018 in Spanish court by Sergey Dozhdev, Igor Sechin uses his offshore companies to control Sistema through MTS and Bashneft.

In 2020, EWUB had €677 million in assets. 

On 27 June 2020, Etienne Schneider became an independent director of Sistema and his close political friend Jeannot Krecké was a director at Sistema beginning in May 2012. In March 2022, Krecké at Sistema and Schneider at EWUB resigned from their positions on their respective boards after public pressure resulting from the 2022 Russian invasion of Ukraine.

Following the February and March 2022 sanctions issued against VTB and its subsidiaries which include the former daughter banks of the Soviet Union's State Bank Gosbank and later the Central Bank of Russia, EWUB in Luxembourg has become the principal Russian overseas bank in Europe after Gazprombank's liquidation. As of early April 2022, Yevtushenkov, Sistema, and its subsidiary East-West United Bank (EWUB) in Luxembourg have not been sanctioned due to Russian interference in Ukraine. As of 2022, Russian billionaires are known to be beneficiaries of the bank.

Director
Vladimir Malinin: 1977 to 1984

Notes

External links
 official site

References

Banks of Luxembourg
1974 establishments in Luxembourg
Sistema
Central Bank of Russia
Banks of the Soviet Union
Luxembourg–Soviet Union relations